Natera is a surname. Notable people with the surname include:

Luis Natera (born 1966), Dominican baseball coach
Ramón Natera, Dominican guerrilla fighter